Einar Ólafsson is the name of:

 Einar Ólafsson (basketball) (born 1928), Icelandic basketball coach
 Einar Ólafsson (skier) (born 1962), Icelandic Olympic cross country skier
 Einar Ólafsson (born 1963), singer and one of Iceland's earliest child stars